Rémy Pointereau (born 30 March 1953) is a member of the Senate of France, representing the Cher department. He is currently a member of The Republicans, having been a member of its predecessor party, The Union for a Popular Movement.

Career
In 2004, Pointereau served as president of the Cher departmental council. He was first elected as senator for Cher on 18 September 2005, following the resignation of Georges Ginoux. He also served as mayor of Lazenay.

References

1953 births
Living people
Politicians from Eure-et-Loir
The Republicans (France) politicians
Union for a Popular Movement politicians
Gaullism, a way forward for France
French Senators of the Fifth Republic
Senators of Cher (department)
Politicians from Centre-Val de Loire